Seven Hickory Township is one of twelve townships in Coles County, Illinois, USA.  As of the 2010 census, its population was 286 and it contained 125 housing units. The township's name changed from Hickory Township on May 7, 1860.

Geography

Cities, towns, villages
 Charleston (north edge)

Unincorporated towns
 Fairgrange

Major highways
  Illinois Route 130

Demographics

School districts
 Arcola Consolidated Unit School District 306
 Charleston Community Unit School District 1
 Oakland Community Unit School District 5

Political districts
 Illinois's 15th congressional district
 State House District 110
 State Senate District 55

References
 
 United States Census Bureau 2007 TIGER/Line Shapefiles
 United States National Atlas

External links
 City-Data.com
 Illinois State Archives

Adjacent townships 

Townships in Coles County, Illinois
Townships in Illinois